The Central Warehouse is a former warehouse building in North Albany, a neighborhood of Albany, New York. The structure is considered a landmark of the community and city. In 1981 the building began to have signs placed on it seen from I-787, and in 1983 one in particular "Year of the Bible" received numerous complaints and the state began proceedings to have it removed. The signs violated the Federal Highway Beautification Act and was removed in 1986. Previous signs from 1981 to 1983 were not disputed by the state because Albany Mayor Erastus Corning 2nd had personally approved them and the New York State Department of Transportation (NYSDOT) chose not to enforce the law since it would be against Corning's wishes, Corning died in 1983. The ice was believed was keeping the ammonia of the refrigeration system from expanding, bursting pipes, and being released into the atmosphere. The building was abandoned in the early 1990s. The ammonia was subsequently drained from the pipes. On October 22, 2010, a fire began in the warehouse and lasted for days, the current owners claimed no structural damage was done to the building and that plans to renovate the building into a residential and retail complex were still possible, over $1 million had already been invested in cleaning the insides of the building. The City of Albany declared a state of emergency on July 29, 2022 after chunks of the building's concrete wall began to fall near the train tracks below. Amtrak, who uses this portion of the track for service west of Albany, temporarily suspended use of the track. On August 1, after the city made emergency repairs to the crumbling wall, Amtrak resumed use of the track. The building's owner was billed by the city for the repair costs.

In October 2022, longtime owner Evan Blum lost control of the property after a judge ruled in favor of foreclosure. The building is now under the management of Albany County.

References

Buildings and structures in Albany, New York
Warehouses in the United States
1927 establishments in New York (state)
Cool warehouses